The 1999 Lipton Championships was a tennis tournament played on outdoor hard courts. It was the 15th edition of the Miami Masters and was part of the Super 9 of the 1999 ATP Tour and of Tier I of the 1999 WTA Tour. Both the men's and women's events took place at the Tennis Center at Crandon Park in Key Biscayne, Florida in the United States from March 15 through March 29, 1999.

WTA entrants

Seeds

Other entrants
The following players received wildcards into the singles main draw:
  Jackie Trail
  Samantha Reeves
  Lori McNeil
  Melissa Middleton
  Mariam Ramon Climent
  Lilia Osterloh
  Mashona Washington
  Jennifer Capriati

The following players received wildcards into the doubles main draw:
  Tara Snyder /  Mashona Washington
  Jennifer Capriati /  Iva Majoli

The following players received entry from the singles qualifying draw:
  Adriana Serra Zanetti
  Marlene Weingärtner
  Tina Pisnik
  Alicia Molik
  Janet Lee
  Meilen Tu
  Jana Kandarr
  Sandra Kleinová

The following player received entry as a lucky loser:
  Christína Papadáki

The following players received entry from the doubles qualifying draw:
  Vanessa Menga /  Elena Wagner

Finals

Men's singles

 Richard Krajicek defeated  Sébastien Grosjean, 4–6, 6–1, 6–2, 7–5
 It was Krajicek's 2nd title of the year and the 20th of his career. It was his 1st Super 9 title of the year and his 2nd overall.

Women's singles

 Venus Williams defeated  Serena Williams, 6–1, 4–6, 6–4
 It was Williams' 3rd title of the year and the 10th of her career. It was her 1st Tier I title of the year and her 2nd overall. It was her 2nd title at the event having also won in 1998.

Men's doubles

 Wayne Black /  Sandon Stolle defeated  Boris Becker /  Jan-Michael Gambill, 6–1, 6–1

Women's doubles

 Martina Hingis /  Jana Novotná defeated  Mary Joe Fernández /  Monica Seles, 0–6, 6–4, 7–6(7–1)

External links
 Official website
 ATP tournament profile
 WTA tournament profile

 
Lipton Championships
Lipton Championships
Miami Open (tennis)
Lipton Championships
Lipton Championships
Lipton Championships